Sony Marathi is an Indian pay television channel that broadcasts programming in Marathi. It was launched on 19 August 2018 and is owned and operated by Culver Max Entertainment.

Current broadcast

Fiction series (Mon-Sat)

Non-fiction shows

Upcoming broadcast

Former broadcast

Drama series
 Anandi He Jag Saare आनंदी हे जग सारे (2019-2020)
 Aathashe Khidkya Naushe Dare आठशे खिडक्या नऊशे दारं (2020)
 Aai Majhi Kalubai आई माझी काळुबाई (2020-2021)
 Ajunahi Barsaat Aahe अजूनही बरसात आहे (2021-2022)
 Assa Maher Nako Ga Baai! अस्सं माहेर नको गं बाई! (2020-2021)
 Ase He Sundar Aamche Ghar असे हे सुंदर आमचे घर (2022)
 Bheti Lagi Jeeva भेटी लागी जीवा (2018-2019)
 Boss Majhi Ladachi बॉस माझी लाडाची (2022)
 Criminals - Chahul Gunhegaranchi क्रिमिनल्स - चाहूल गुन्हेगारांची (2021-2022)
 Duniyadari Filmy Ishtyle दुनियादारी फिल्मी इश्टाइल (2018-2019)
 Ek Hoti Rajkanya एक होती राजकन्या (2019)
 Garja Maharashtra गर्जा महाराष्ट्र (2018)
 Gossip Aani Barach Kahi गॉसीप आणि बरंच काही (2022)
 H.M. Bane T.M. Bane ह.म. बने तु.म. बने (2018-2020)
 Hrudyat Vaje Something हृदयात वाजे समथिंग (2018-2019)
 Jigarbaaz जिगरबाज (2020-2021)
 Julata Julata Julatay Ki जुळता जुळता जुळतंय की (2018-2019)
 Mi Tujhich Re मी तुझीच रे (2019)
 Navri Mile Navryala नवरी मिळे नवऱ्याला (2019-2020)
 Saare Tujhyachsathi सारे तुझ्याचसाठी (2018-2019)
 Savitrijoti सावित्रीजोती (2020)
 Shreemantagharchi Soon श्रीमंताघरची सून (2020-2021)
 Swarajya Janani Jijamata स्वराज्यजननी जिजामाता (2019-2021)
 Swarajya Saudamini Tararani स्वराज्य सौदामिनी ताराराणी (2021-2022)
 Ti Phulrani ती फुलराणी (2018-2019)
 Tu Chandane Shimpit Jashi तू चांदणे शिंपीत जाशी (2021)
 Tu Saubhagyawati Ho तू सौभाग्यवती हो (2021)
 Tumchi Mulgi Kay Karte? तुमची मुलगी काय करते? (2021-2023)
 Tumchya Aamchyatali Kusum तुमच्या आमच्यातली कुसुम (2021-2022)
 Vaidehi - Shatjanmache Apule Naate वैदेही - शतजन्माचे आपुले नाते (2021)
 Year Down इयर डाऊन (2018-2019)

Dubbed series
 Mahabali Hanuman महाबली हनुमान (2019–2020)

Reality shows
 Jai Jai Maharashtra Majha जय जय महाराष्ट्र माझा (2020)
 Indian Idol Marathi इंडियन आयडॉल मराठी (2021-2022)
 Kon Honar Crorepati कोण होणार करोडपती (2019-2022)
 Maharashtra's Best Dancer महाराष्ट्राज् बेस्ट डान्सर (2020-2021)
 Maharashtracha Favourite Dancer महाराष्ट्राचा फेव्हरेट डान्सर (2018)
 Shravanbhakti श्रवणभक्ती (2021)
 Singing Star सिंगिंग स्टार (2020)
 Super Dancer Maharashtra सुपर डान्सर महाराष्ट्र (2018-2019)

References

External links
 Official website
 Watch Sony Marathi Live on SonyLIV

Television stations in Mumbai
Marathi-language television channels
Sony Pictures Networks India
Television channels and stations established in 2018
Mass media in Maharashtra